West Glacier may refer to:
 West Glacier, Montana, a small unincorporated community in eastern Flathead County, Montana, United States.
 West Glacier (Amtrak station), West Glacier, Montana is a station stop for the Amtrak Empire Builder railway in West Glacier, Montana.